The Masked Singer is a Greek reality singing competition television series that premiered on Skai TV on 31 March 2022. It is part of the Masked Singer franchise which began in South Korea and features celebrities singing songs while wearing head-to-toe costumes and face masks concealing their identities. The show is hosted by Sakis Rouvas, the program employs panelists who guess the celebrities' identities by interpreting clues provided to them throughout each season. Elisavet Konstantinidou, Thodoris Marantinis, Nikos Moutsinas and Athina Oikonomakou appear in each episode and vote alongside an audience for their favorite singer after all perform. The least popular is eliminated, taking off their mask to reveal their identity. The first season ended on 2 July 2022 with actor Renos Haralambidis coming in first as "Minotavros" and singer Sarbel coming in second as "Moro".

To prevent their identities from being revealed before each prerecorded episode is broadcast, the program makes extensive use of code names, disguises, non-disclosure agreements, and a team of security guards.

Format
The show features a group of celebrity contestants. In a typical episode, eight contestants each sing a 90-second cover for panelists and an audience anonymously in costume. Hints to their identities are given before and occasionally after each performs. The perennial format is a taped interview with a celebrity's electronically masked voice narrating a video showing cryptic allusions to what they are known for. After performances, and before an elimination, the panelists are given time to speculate each singer's identity out loud and write comments in note binders. They may ask questions and the host may offer additional clues. After performances conclude, the audience and panelists vote for their favorite singer using an electronic device. The least popular contestant then takes off their mask to reveal their identity.

Production
The broadcast format started in South Korea in 2015 as King of Mask Singer. In 2019, it was rumored that Skai TV would air in Greece the format of Masked Singer, that have been aired also in Asia, the United States and lot of other countries. In November 2019, it was announced that Skai TV will broadcast the show in 2020. The makers of Skai TV are in feverish preparations, as they are preparing to air not one, but two talent shows when 2021 arrives. The reason of course is House of Fame and The Masked Singer. But at the end of the 2020-2021 television season, Skai TV did not air The Masked Singer, but it was announced that will begin air in 2021-2022 television season. It was announced that Skai TV wants that the show to begin air in February 2022. This particular project was due to air two years ago and in March 2022 the first trailer was seen.

Panelists and host

Several artists were rumored to be part of the panel once Skai TV announced the show. Model Iliana Papageorgiou was rumored as the host of the show, but Skai TV denied the agreement. Then Skai TV announced the singer Sakis Rouvas as the presenter of the show.

It was rumored that singer Harry Varthakouris has already been booked to be on the show as a panelist, as he was already a member of Skai's staff due to Big Brother, while discussions were well underway with TV presenter and actor Nikos Moutsinas, who is also a member of the station's staff, as well as with singer Tamta, singer Eleni Foureira, Giorgos Tsalikis and Phoebus On 21 March 2022, Skai TV announced that the panel will be actress Elisavet Konstantinidou, singer and songwriter Thodoris Marantinis, TV presenter and actor Nikos Moutsinas and actress Athina Oikonomakou.

In the 10th episode, Katerina Stikoudi was a guest and sang as the Skiachtro, she was immediately unmasked after her performance. For the rest of the episode she was the guest panelist.

Contestants

 

(WC) This masked singer is a wild card contestant.

Episodes

Week 1 (31 March)

Week 2 (7 April)

Week 3 (14 April)

Week 4 (28 April)

Week 5 (5 May)

Week 6 (21 May)

Week 7 (28 May)

Week 8 (4 June)

Week 9 (11 June)

Week 10 (18 June)

Week 11 (25 June)

Week 12 - Final (2 July)

Ratings

Note

  Outside top 20.

References

External links
 

Skai TV original programming
2020s Greek television series
2022 Greek television series debuts
2022 Greek television seasons
Greek-language television shows
Television shows set in Greece
Masked Singer